The Caul Bourne is a stream on the Isle of Wight, England.

Its source is in an ornamental lake, near Winkle Street in Calbourne, from which it runs to the north (like most other rivers on the Isle of Wight) through Newbridge and Shalfleet. It is joined by several tributaries before flowing into The Solent via Newtown estuary, a Site of Special Scientific Interest.

The river was subject to flooding in December 1993 when a longer than normal period of precipitation (over 8 hours of rainfall) led to four houses in Shalfleet suffering £36,000 of damage between them.

References

Caul Bourne